The 2009 Arizona Wildcats football team represented the University of Arizona in the 2009 NCAA Division I FBS college football season. The Wildcats, led by sixth-year head coach Mike Stoops, played their home games at Arizona Stadium.

Arizona hosted Central Michigan of the Mid-American Conference to begin the season on September 5, 2009 (with a 19–6 win), and ended the regular season with a 21–17 win over perennial conference power, then-ranked #20 Southern California on December 5, 2009; this was the first victory over USC by the Wildcats in the Mike Stoops era.

In addition to the slate of nine conference games, four at home and five on the road, the Wildcats traveled to Iowa City, Iowa and lost to the Iowa Hawkeyes of the Big Ten (who eventually finished with a #10 AP Poll ranking and an invitation to the Orange Bowl), and hosted in-state sister school Northern Arizona of the Big Sky Conference the preceding week.

After posting an 8–4 regular season record (6–3 in the Pac-10, good for a second-place tie in the conference with Oregon State and Stanford), the Wildcats were invited to appear in the 2009 Holiday Bowl in San Diego, the second consecutive postseason bowl game for the Arizona football program under Stoops.  The Wildcats were shut out 33–0 by Nebraska.

The Wildcats finished the regular season with an Associated Press poll ranking of #22, their first national ranking since the 2000 season.

Schedule

Schedule Source: 2009 Arizona Wildcats football schedule and Arizona Official Athletic Site .

Rankings

Game summaries

Central Michigan

at Arizona Stadium, Tucson, Arizona

The Wildcats’ season began following a 43-minute lightning delay, the second straight year the Arizona season opener was delayed by lightning.

Central Michigan was flagged for a false start on its first play from scrimmage. After a short completion and a trap-play run, CMU quarterback Dan LeFevour was intercepted by LB Vuni Tuihamalaka at the Chippewas’ 31, but the Wildcats, on their third play from scrimmage (in the person of WR Bug Wright) coughed up the ball at CMU's 16. The UA forced Central Michigan to go three-and-out on its second drive, then drove to score.

The 'Cats forced a second turnover just before the end of the quarter. Linebacker C.J. Parish drilled CMU's Antonio Brown on a punt return, forcing the ball loose. UA longsnapper Jason Bertoni, who started his career at Central Michigan (before leaving the Chippewa program in 2007 for personal reasons), recovered at CMU's 28.

The Wildcats gained seven yards on three plays, setting up a 37-yard Alex Zendejas field goal. Zendejas hit a total of four field goals in his first college start.

Arizona's first touchdown of the season came midway through the second quarter.

Freshman QB Matt Scott led the Wildcats on a nine-play, 63-yard drive. RB Nic Grigsby capped it with a three-yard run up the middle. Zendejas’ PAT made it a 13-point lead.

Central Michigan was hampered by the quickness of the Arizona defense and didn’t score until there were 12 minutes 21 seconds remaining in the game; even then, the team failed to convert on a two-point conversion that would have made it a one-possession game.

Scott completed 10 of 17 first-half passes for 110 yards. Sophomore QB Nick Foles did not play a snap in the entire game. TE Rob Gronkowski, a key offensive weapon for Arizona in 2008 and speculated to be a future top NFL draft pick, did not play in the opener because of a back injury.

Northern Arizona

at Arizona Stadium, Tucson, Arizona

The Wildcats were effective, if not totally crisp, in a 34–17 win over in-state rival Northern Arizona (NAU), a FCS (formerly Division I-AA) member of the Big Sky Conference.

Junior RB Nicolas Grigsby rushed for two touchdowns; Grigsby's two scores — a 25-yard run and a 30-yard run — helped pace the Wildcats through a sometimes-choppy first half in front of 50,623 at Arizona Stadium.

He was key to the Wildcats' final drive of the second quarter, an 18-play, 99-yard march. WR Terrell Turner gave the Wildcats a 21–10 lead with a 2-yard touchdown catch from starting QB Matt Scott, a play after WR Delashaun Dean hauled in a 23-yard grab. Dean was drilled by two NAU players at the end of the play, and had to be helped off the field. Scott then found Turner on a short pass to pad the Wildcats' lead.

Arizona added two scores in the second half to put the Lumberjacks away. Sophomore RB Keola Antolin punched in a 1-yard score on the first play following Grigsby's 94-yard run to give the Wildcats a 27–10 lead with 10 minutes left in the quarter.

Backup quarterback Nick Foles hit Juron Criner for a 5-yard touchdown pass on the second play of the fourth quarter to make it 34–10.

The Wildcats began emptying their bench midway through the third quarter. Foles entered the game with 7:15 remaining in the quarter, and drove the team about 40 yards before fumbling a snap and turning the ball over. CB Trevin Wade's second interception of the third quarter gave Arizona the ball back.

Arizona has not lost to NAU since 1937. All three of Arizona's state universities (Arizona, NAU and Arizona State) are obligated under state law to play one another in athletic contests each year.

Iowa

at Kinnick Stadium, Iowa City, Iowa

The Hawkeyes scored on the opening drive, with a 2-yard touchdown run by Adam Robinson. But Arizona tied the score at 7 after Trevin Wade returned a Ricky Stanzi interception 38 yards into the end zone.

The Wildcats struggled with their few offensive chances.

QB Matt Scott missed a handful of open receivers in the third quarter, and — on a play that could have changed the momentum of the game — WR Delashaun Dean dropped what would have been a 50-yard gain. Dean appeared to trap the ball between his leg and the ground; a video replay rule confirmed that it was an incomplete pass.

Iowa's defense would again prove to be the difference-maker in this game, not allowing a touchdown until 1:53 was remaining in the game, with the Hawkeyes well ahead. Iowa safety Tyler Sash, with a grab of a Matt Scott pass intended for Terrell Turner, also netted his seventh interception in five games (dating back to last year).

Nick Foles came in at QB in the fourth quarter and went 6 for 11 with a 10-yard touchdown pass to Juron Criner, but, as noted above, the damage was already done.

The loss dropped Arizona to 0–7 against Big Ten teams in the last decade; the Wildcats’ last nonconference road win of any kind came in 2001, when John Mackovic's Wildcats defeated San Diego State.

Oregon State

at Reser Stadium, Corvallis, Oregon

Running behind a third-string tailback and second-team left tackle, right guard and wide receiver (as well as a new starting QB, sophomore Nick Foles, the transfer from Michigan State) the Wildcats defeated Oregon State 35–32 at Reser Stadium in Corvallis, in the Pac-10 opener for Arizona. The Wildcats started the game without a half-dozen starters, including tight end Rob Gronkowski (who would end up being out the rest of the 2009 season due to back surgery). Tailbacks Nicolas Grigsby and Keola Antolin were out of the game by halftime with shoulder and leg injuries, respectively (Grigsby would not fully recover until the end of the season).

That left the Wildcats with third-stringer Greg Nwoko at running back. The redshirt freshman from the Austin, Texas area delivered: His 52-yard catch-and-run on a screen pass set Arizona up for its second touchdown of the quarter, a 3-yard pass from quarterback Nick Foles to receiver Juron Criner. Nwoko rushed nine times for 44 yards and a touchdown in the first extended action of his career.

Arizona took the lead early in the third quarter, when Foles — making his first college start — dove in on a sneak from the 1-yard line. Foles led his team on a 15-play, 71-yard scoring drive in the first quarter, connecting with WR Delashaun Dean for a 2-yard touchdown pass.
 
The Beavers scored their first touchdown with 2 minutes remaining in the quarter, when Damola Adeniji caught a tipped pass from QB Sean Canfield for an 11-yard score. James Rodgers gave OSU a 14–7 lead with a 2-yard run midway through the second quarter. Arizona tied the game on Nwoko's touchdown, but the Beavers re-took the lead on the final play before halftime. Justin Kahut's 21-yard field goal made it 17–14.

Foles appeared to put the game away when he found WR Terrell Turner for a 13-yard touchdown pass with eight minutes remaining, but the Beavers — resilient and persistent — proved tough to put away. Canfield found Aaron Nichols for a 13-yard score with 4:09 remaining, cutting Arizona's lead to 3.

CB Devin Ross intercepted Canfield with 1 minute 33 seconds remaining.

Even after surrendering a safety with 25 seconds left, Oregon State recovered an onside kick and had the ball, down five points, in their zone. This time, Arizona made the plays. Sacks by Earl Mitchell and Ricky Elmore ended the game.

Grigsby left the game after just one rushing attempt with what was discovered to be a sprained AC joint in his right shoulder. He was never fully healthy the rest of the season.

Washington

at Husky Stadium, Seattle, Washington

In a controversial play, Washington LB Mason Foster intercepted a deflected pass off the foot of Arizona's Delashaun Dean (who insisted the pass hit the ground) and returned the carom 37 yards for a touchdown with 2:37 left, and the Huskies rallied with two touchdowns in the final three minutes to beat the Wildcats 36–33 in Seattle.

On the call, Dean commented: "I felt it graze my foot, but the way the ball bounced up, it would have hit my foot a lot harder", Dean said. "I figured it had to hit the ground, then after seeing the pictures you could actually see the black beads from the turf jump up when the ball hit the ground. It's pretty obvious when you look at it. I don't know how it got missed."

Led by quarterback Jake Locker, Washington overcame a 12-point deficit in the final 3 minutes to hand Arizona the loss. Arizona lost the game despite a torrid third quarter. QB Nick Foles connected with David Roberts on a 9-yard touchdown pass on the Wildcats’ first possession of the second half. The Wildcats got the ball back — and scored again — following a strange play.

Washington punter Will Mahan muffed a snap on fourth down deep in the Huskies' zone on their first possession of the second half. He recovered the muff, took a few steps and kicked a ball that rolled 12 yards behind the original line of scrimmage. Mahan was flagged for an illegal kick, and the Huskies were penalized half the distance to the goal line – 9 yards.

Arizona turned the good fortune into a 23-yard Alex Zendejas field goal. The Wildcats capped their 17-point quarter with an eight-play, 36-yard drive; Foles delivered the crushing blow on third-and-goal from the Huskies’ 1, faking a hand-off up the middle and bootlegging into the end zone for a touchdown.

Washington cut Arizona's lead to six points just before the quarter's end, when Devin Aguilar caught his second touchdown pass of the night, a 29-yarder from Jake Locker. But Zendejas nailed a 29-yarder on the first possession of the fourth quarter.

The UA was leading 33–21 when Washington took over with the ball with 4:16 remaining in the contest. But the Wildcats' LB Vuna Tuihalamka was flagged for a late hit on a missed pass, getting Washington past midfield. It took quarterback Jake Locker six plays to travel 59 yards; his 25-yard touchdown pass to tight end Kavario Middleton cut the Wildcats' lead to 33–28 with 2:55 left.

The Huskies then chose to kick the ball deep, figuring that — with two timeouts left — they could try to force Arizona to punt. The Wildcats instead went for the kill. On first down, the Wildcats called what Stoops dubbed a run-pass option play, meaning Foles could check down to a run or choose to throw. He threw.

When his first few options weren't there, the quarterback attempted a short screen route to Dean. The ball glanced off the side of his right shoe and into Mason Foster's hands. The Huskies' linebacker ran in untouched. The defeat of Arizona came as the Husky football program, winless during the 2008 season, was trying to rebuild under their new head coach, former USC offensive coordinator Steve Sarkisian (for their part, the Huskies finished the season 5–7 and 4–5 in Pac-10 play).

Following the game, head coach Mike Stoops said Arizona coaches were to blame for the poor call — even though Foles had been running the play all night with great success. He completed 39 of 53 passes for 384 yards and a touchdown. Offensive coordinator Sonny Dykes, however, defended the call.  Arizona settled for four field goals and continued to struggle in the red zone. The Wildcats limited Locker to just 140 passing yards, but let him drive at will when one stop would have ended the game.

Stanford

at Arizona Stadium, Tucson

In a game that featured more than a thousand offensive yards, the Wildcats rallied back late to defeat the Cardinal. The quarterbacks were evenly matched: Stanford quarterback Andrew Luck threw for 423 yards and three touchdowns, while Arizona's Nick Foles also tossed three touchdown passes and had a total of 415 yards. Stanford's Toby Gerhart had 123 yards and two touchdowns. Arizona managed a total of just 138 rush yards, but 57 of those came on Nic Grigsby's go-ahead touchdown with under three minutes left. Stanford drove to the Arizona 17 with seconds to play, but a fourth-down pass to Chris Owusu was batted away and the Wildcats escaped with a home victory.

UCLA

at Arizona Stadium, Tucson

In the first quarter, Arizona's first drive ended when UCLA safety Rahim Moore intercepted a Nick Foles pass. But in their second drive, Foles passed to Juron Criner for a 41-yard touchdown to give the Wildcats a lead. After Arizona recovered a Bruin fumble, Grigsby rushed into the end zone for a 6-yard touchdown, extra point blocked.

Both Moore and Jerzy Siewierski intercepted a Wildcats pass in the second quarter. Kai Forbath kicked a 53-yard field goal to put UCLA on the board before the half. UCLA's Datone Jones recovered a Foles fumble and Forbath kicked a field goal to begin the third quarter. Kevin Craft came in to replace Kevin Prince in UCLA's second possession, but Christian Ramirez fumbled the ball to Arizona, which led to the Wildcats' third touchdown, a Nick Foles 25-yard pass to Criner. Tony Dye recovered a Wildcats fumble and ran in for a 28-yard UCLA touchdown. Late in the third quarter, Nick Booth rushed for 6 yards for a score to give Arizona a 27–13 lead.

In the fourth quarter, the Bruins were unable to do anything and lost their fourth game in a row.

Washington State

at Arizona Stadium, Tucson

California

at California Memorial Stadium, Berkeley

In their final home season game, California started backup RB Shane Vereen in place of their star RB Jahvid Best, who was still recovering from a concussion sustained the previous week. The then-#18 ranked Wildcats were also missing their starting RB, Nic Grigsby, with ongoing shoulder troubles.

Cal's Giorgio Tavecchio hit four field goals, including a 22-yard go-ahead kick with 4 minutes 46 seconds remaining, to boost the Golden Bears past a desperate UA team.

Tavecchio contributed in other ways, too. After hitting the field goal that put Cal ahead for good, the kicker tackled Arizona's Travis Cobb on a kickoff return. Bolstered by Cobb's return, the Wildcats drove deep into Cal territory.

Arizona faced third-and-three from the Cal 25 when QB Nick Foles dropped back and attempted a short pass. The ball deflected off a Cal defender and back into the hands of Foles, who rolled right and threw it forward again — this time for a completion to WR Delashaun Dean. Foles was flagged for an illegal forward pass, and Arizona was penalized 5 yards from the spot of the penalty, 9 yards behind the line of scrimmage. The Wildcats' field goal unit stood on the sideline when, on fourth-and-17 from the Golden Bears' 39, Foles attempted a desperate pass to David Roberts that was broken up.

Foles' mistake was emblematic of the Cats' struggles. Arizona gained just 274 yards, 174 below its season average. Foles completed 25 of 41 passes for 201 yards and a touchdown, but was intercepted once and sacked three times. Foles had only been sacked four times before all season before the game. The Wildcats rushed for just 73 yards as a team, a 2.6 yards-per-carry average that rarely equates to wins. And yet Arizona had its chances.

Cal scored a late touchdown but botched a PAT attempt, leaving Arizona a chance to drive for a game-tying touchdown and two-point conversion. The Wildcats had hope, but struggled to make the simplest of plays. Their last drive included an incomplete pass, a holding call (which was declined) and two sacks.

Things weren't much better on defense.

California QB Kevin Riley threw for 181 yards and a score, with two interceptions. Vereen had 30 carries for 159 yards, both career highs, including one score. Keola Antolin, who had rushed for 149 yards against the Bears in 2008, was held to 78 yards and a score. This was Cal's fourth straight victory over the Wildcats in Berkeley, and moved them up to #25 in the BCS rankings (they would go on to an 8–5 (5–4 Pac-10) regular season and lose 37–27 to Utah in the 2009 Poinsettia Bowl).

Arizona, on the other hand, seemed to have its relatively high hopes for its first-ever appearance in the Rose Bowl placed in jeopardy with the frustrating road loss.

Oregon

at Arizona Stadium, Tucson

Oregon uniform combination: green helmet, white jersey with silver numbers, black pants

In a PAC-10 conference showdown that prompted College Gameday to pay its first visit to the University of Arizona campus, the outcome of the game would ultimately send the winning team to the Rose Bowl Game. The Fans and the Arizona Wildcats players all wore red with the intent to "Red Out Oregon".

Oregon QB Jeremiah Masoli's touchdown plunge on third-and-goal in the second overtime period gave the Ducks a come-from-behind, 44–41 victory over the U of A before 57,863 fans at Arizona Stadium and a national TV audience (ESPN on ABC). The Ducks overcame a 10-point fourth-quarter deficit to force overtime, then scored touchdowns on both their possessions. Hundreds of red-clad Arizona students from the "Zona Zoo" student section were on the sidelines, preparing for a victory party, when Masoli hit tight end Ed Dickson for an 8-yard touchdown with six seconds left in regulation to tie the game.

The teams traded scores in the first overtime; Arizona started the second OT with the ball and hit a field goal only to watch the Ducks drive 25 yards in four plays for the win.

Masoli was brilliant in a 15-play, 80-yard drive at the end of regulation, converting on two fourth-down plays to get deep into Arizona territory. With Oregon trailing 31–24, Masoli found Dickson in the middle of the end zone. Kicker Morgan Flint's PAT tied it at 31, forcing the first overtime game at Arizona Stadium since 2003.

Oregon started overtime with the ball, and drove quickly. LaMichael James' 21-yard run moved the Ducks to Arizona's 4. On third-and-goal, Masoli found Jeff Maehl for a 4-yard touchdown. The Wildcats tied the game on its ensuing possession when QB Nick Foles hit Juron Criner for a 3-yard score, the receiver's third touchdown of the night. Arizona HC Mike Stoops instantly sent place-kicker Alex Zendejas out to tie it, though a two-point conversion could have won the game.

The Wildcats had the ball to start the second overtime but gained just 1 yard on three plays. Zendejas gave the UA a 41–38 lead with a 41-yard field goal. It didn't last. Masoli found Dickson on a 23-yard pass on Oregon's first play of the second overtime. The Ducks gained a yard on their next two plays, setting up third-and-goal from the 1. Masoli faked on a lead-option play and ran in the score.

The result left Arizona reeling, especially since the Wildcats appeared to have the game in hand in the fourth quarter. Arizona led by a touchdown late when Foles attempted to put the game away with a pass into the end zone; WR Terrell Turner tipped the ball, and Oregon's Talmadge Jackson III intercepted it and took a touchback.

Wide receiver David Douglas fumbled at the Ducks' 2 in the first quarter. CB Trevin Wade dropped a sure interception in the second half, and Zendejas missed a short field goal that would have put the UA up by 6.

The Wildcats' defense, so solid all night, forced two Masoli fumbles but couldn't recover them.
That only made it worse. "We let a lot of good things slip away", safety Cam Nelson said. "I don't really know what else to say."

In winning, Oregon eliminated Arizona from Rose Bowl contention. Masoli finished with 345 yards of total offense and six touchdowns.

Arizona State

Alex Zendejas kicked a 32-yard field goal as time expired, and the Wildcats defeated their primary in-state rival, Arizona State (ASU), 20–17 in Tempe to retain the Territorial Cup.

Arizona won after ASU's Kyle Williams – who had caught the tying touchdown pass minutes earlier – muffed a punt to give the Wildcats the ball at the ASU 22-yard line. Keola Antolin scored on a 67-yard run and Orlando Vargas blocked a punt and returned it for a touchdown for the Wildcats, who have beaten the Sun Devils in back-to-back seasons for the first time since 1997–98.

Dimitri Nance ran for 115 yards for the Sun Devils, who lost their last six games, matching the school record for consecutive losses in a season.

Down 14–0 at halftime, the Sun Devils rallied and appeared ready to force Arizona into their second overtime situation of the season with 2:02 remaining. On 4th-and-12 from Arizona's 14, ASU QB Danny Sullivan rolled out of the pocket and fired a strike to a diving Williams in the back of the end zone. It was their second scoring connection of the quarter, following a 44-yarder with 11:54 to go.

Arizona defense was led by Ricky Elmore who had 2 sacks, 5 tackles and 1 forced fumble.

Then came a critical ASU error. Williams muffed a Keenyn Crier punt, and the Wildcats' Mike Turner recovered at the Sun Devils' 22-yard line. Four plays later, Zendejas, a Phoenix-area native (some of his Glendale, Arizona family were in attendance), trotted on and nailed the game-winner.

The game ended with a scuffle at midfield. ASU linebacker Vontaze Burfict took a swing at UA backup longsnapper Ricky Wolder. Vontaze Burfict a true-freshman at 6feet 3 inches and 245 pounds swung wildly at Wolder without making any contact. Players from both sides had to be separated so they could clear the field.

This was Mike Stoops' third win over Arizona State, and arguably the most important one of his career.

USC

In the season finale, WR Juron Criner dived into the end zone with a 36-yard touchdown pass from Nick Foles with 3:14 to play, and Arizona secured a 21–17 victory USC.

Foles passed for 239 yards and two touchdowns and ran for another score for the Wildcats, who finally beat USC for the first time in coach Mike Stoops' tenure by scoring the final touchdown in a defense-dominated game. Foles went 22 of 40 but made several clutch throws, including an early touchdown pass to WR Delashaun Dean.

The Wildcats ended a seven-game losing streak against USC, and the Wildcats also have their first win over the Trojans during the Pete Carroll era. The Trojans, who came into the contest ranked #20 in the Associated Press poll, dropped out of the national rankings with the loss and dropped to #24 in the BCS standings.

Arizona is also the first non-Stanford team in the Pac-10 to defeat USC in the Coliseum during the Carroll era (Stanford defeated Carroll's teams in the Coliseum in 2001, 2007, and 2009 while the Big 12's Kansas State defeated the Trojans in the Coliseum in 2001—the only other victory by a team over a USC home team coached by Carroll).  With the Wildcats' win, Arizona State becomes the only remaining Pac-10 team that has never beaten the Trojans in the Carroll era.

With a final regular season overall record of 8–4, Arizona accepted an invitation to the 2009 Pacific Life Holiday Bowl after this game. The Trojans were invited to the 2009 Emerald Bowl in San Francisco, they defeated Boston College 24–13.

Nebraska (2009 Holiday Bowl)

at Qualcomm Stadium, San Diego, California

The Cornhuskers, coming off a heartbreaking loss to Texas in the 2009 Big 12 Championship Game (thereby missing a chance at a BCS bowl game berth), defeated the Wildcats 33–0 for the first shutout in the history of the Holiday Bowl. This was a rematch of the two teams, who faced each other in the 1998 Holiday Bowl, where Arizona defeated Nebraska 23–20.

The Wildcats were held to just 109 total yards of offense and just 6 first downs. The 'Huskers were led on offense by WR Niles Paul who had 4 catches for 123 yards, including a touchdown, which accounted for 74 of his receiving yards. Quarterback Zac Lee threw for 173 yards and the touchdown to Paul. Rex Burkhead of Nebraska led all rushers with 89 yards and a touchdown on 17 carries. This also marked the first time in Nebraska's 46 game, bowl game history that it has shut out a team in postseason. However, this was the third time in Arizona's bowl history that they have been shut out, the second time in a game in San Diego. The Wildcats lost the 1921 San Diego East-West Christmas Classic to Centre College 38–0 and the 1990 Aloha Bowl to Syracuse 28–0. Prior to the 2009 Holiday Bowl no team had scored less than 10 points in a game. The game also marked Nebraska's first 10-win season since 2003.

Notes
 Up until this season, Arizona was one of only two Pacific-10 Conference teams that had not beaten USC during the Pete Carroll era.

Awards and honors
All-Pacific-10 Conference Team:
 Second Team: OL Colin Baxter; OL Adam Grant; DL Earl Mitchell; LB Xavier Kelley; DB Trevin Wade
 Honorable mention: DE Ricky Elmore; QB Nick Foles; CB Devin Ross; MLB Vuna Tuihalamaka

References

Arizona
Arizona Wildcats football seasons
Arizona Wildcats football